Jan Fegter (born 19 September 1969) is a German male handball player. He was a member of the Germany men's national handball team. He was part of the  team at the 1996 Summer Olympics, playing five matches. On club level he played for SG Flensburg-Handewitt in Flensburg.

References

1969 births
Living people
German male handball players
Handball players at the 1996 Summer Olympics
Olympic handball players of Germany
People from Norden, Lower Saxony
Sportspeople from Lower Saxony